The Second Ayers Ministry was the 11th Ministry of the Government of South Australia, led by Henry Ayers. It commenced on 22 July 1864, when Ayers succeeded in reconstituting his ministry following its defeat on a no-confidence motion. It collapsed within days when both the new ministers, William Milne and Randolph Isham Stow, resigned, necessitating the resignation of the entire ministry. It was succeeded on 4 August 1864 by the First Blyth Ministry.

References

Ayers 2